Sexual Compulsives Anonymous (SCA) is a twelve-step program for people who want to stop having compulsive sex. SCA founding is attributed variously to 1982 in New York City and to 1973 in Los Angeles. Although the fellowship originally sought to address issues of sexual compulsion among gay and bisexual men, and this is still the fellowships predominant demographic, today the program is LGBT friendly, open to all sexual orientations, and there is an increasing number of women and heterosexual men participating. SCA meetings are most likely to be held in urban areas with larger gay and bisexual male populations. The majority of members are white, but vary in age and socioeconomic background. The only requirement for membership is a desire to stop having compulsive  sex.

Sexual recovery plans 
 SCA supports healthy sexual expression and does not expect members to repress their sexuality, which they believe is associated with sexual anorexia. Members are encouraged to develop their own definition of sexual sobriety that does not place unreasonable demands on their time or energy, place them in legal jeopardy, or endanger their health. SCA members incorporate their definition of sexual sobriety into what they call a sexual recovery plan. Sexual recovery plans are modeled on the work of Patrick Carnes, a sexual addiction researcher, based on the model for Overeaters Anonymous (OA), whose members create individualized "food plans."

Sexual recovery plans have three columns: abstinence, high-risk, and recovery—analogous to the three circles used in Sex Addicts Anonymous. The sexual recovery plan is used as a blueprint for recovery. The abstinence column includes "bottom-line" behaviors corresponding to relapse and from which members ask their Higher Power to be freed. The high-risk column includes behaviors, emotional states, ritualized activities, and situations that make them vulnerable to relapse. The recovery column includes positive behaviors that support their wellbeing and meet their needs in a healthy manner.

Literature and publications 
SCA distributes its own literature, including the primary book used in the fellowship, Sexual Compulsives Anonymous: A Program of Recovery, and several book-length and smaller brochures and pamphlets, such as What About Masturbation?, Q&A: A Guide for Newcomers and Secret Shame. Parts of these brochures are published on the SCA website. SCA also publishes an online journal known as The SCAnner.
 
 
 
 
 
 
 

SCA developed "The Twenty Questions," an instrument allowing potential members to self-evaluate their sexual compulsivity. The results of this questionnaire correlate with symptoms of prefrontal cortex dysfunction, an area of the brain thought to be relevant to addiction—not only to substances, but also behaviors such as sex and gambling as measured according to the (FrSBe) Frontal Systems Behavior Scale.

See also 
 List of twelve-step groups
 Sex Addicts Anonymous
 Sex and Love Addicts Anonymous
 Sexaholics Anonymous

References

External links
 Sexual Compulsives Anonymous
 The SCAnner
 Documentation and KPFK recordings concerning earliest West Coast meetings starting in 1973
 

Addiction organizations in Canada
Twelve-step programs
Human sexuality organizations
Organizations established in 1982
Sexual addiction
LGBT family and peer support groups
1982 establishments in New York City